The Union of Armenians of Romania (UAR; , RHM) is an ethnic minority political party in Romania representing the Armenian community.

History
The UAR contested the 1990 general elections, and despite receiving only 399 votes (0.003%), it won a single seat in the Chamber of Deputies under the electoral law that allows for political parties representing ethnic minority groups to be exempt from the electoral threshold. It has won a seat in every election since.

Electoral history

References

External links
Official website

Non-registered political parties in Romania
Political parties of minorities in Romania
Armenian diaspora in Romania